Ricardo López Méndez (7 February 1903 – 28 December 1989)
was a Mexican poet and song lyricist. He was born in Izamal, Yucatán. He became director of the Public Library and an advisor to Felipe Carrillo Puerto,  governor of Yucatán from 1922 to 1924. In 1927 he moved to Mexico City as a representative of the government of Yucatán. He was a founder of the radio station XEW (and others across Mexico) and a pioneer of the use of radio to access rural populations. He also became vice president of the Society of Authors and Composers (SACM).

In 2004 his collected poetry and journalism were published as Poesía y Pensamiento. His poem El Credo Mexicano (Mexican Creed) is a popular patriotic declaration of faith in the country. He also penned the lyrics to the popular song "Amor, Amor, Amor".

One of his radio stations still bears his initials as its callsign, XHRLM-FM in Ciudad Mante, Tamaulipas.

References

1903 births
1989 deaths
Writers from Yucatán (state)
Mexican male poets
Mexican songwriters
Male songwriters
20th-century Mexican poets
20th-century Mexican male writers
20th-century male musicians